Giri Raj Singh Sirohi was the first Indian to set foot on the south pole of Antarctica. Sirohi is a [(scientist)] who carried out research at the South Pole in Antarctica in 1960 for around 100 days in sub-zero temperatures. Sirohi received the lifetime award from the Indian Society for Plant Physiology in 2003.

To honour his breakthrough contribution to the Science of Plant Physiology, the US Government instructed the United States Board on Geographic Names to name a place in Antarctica after him  as Sirohi Point in 1961.

The objective of the experiments was to collect data on the Biological Clock at the South Pole, since it represented a place where the rotational activity of the Earth could be negated.  The plant material (soybeans, etc.) and animal material (hamsters, etc.) were studied at the South Pole.  Project work took almost 12 months, out of which 4 months were spent at the South Pole in Antarctica.

He co-authored a book on plant-physiology.

References

 Dr. G.S. Sirohi Award

External links
 Website
 http://www.nature.com/nature/journal/v195/n4840/abs/195476a0.html

Living people
20th-century Indian botanists
Year of birth missing (living people)